The Æsir are the gods of the principal pantheon in Old Norse religion and Norse mythology. The second Norse pantheon is the Vanir, these two pantheons waged war against each other, resulting in a unified pantheon.

Etymology

Æsir is the plural of áss, ǫ́ss "god". "national god" is a title of Thor, as is  "almighty god", while it is Odin who is "the" . There is also Old East Norse dialectal *ās-ækia (OWN: *áss-ekja), i.e. "god ride" (Thor riding in his wagon), resulting in the modern Swedish word for atmospheric thunder – åska (the form åsekia attested as late as the 17th c.).

The feminine suffix  (Proto-Norse: -unjō) is known from a few other nouns denoting female animals, such as  "female monkey",  "she-wolf". A cognate word for "goddess" is not attested outside Old Norse, and a corresponding West Germanic word would have been separately derived with the feminine suffixes -inī or -injō.

Áss is attested in other Germanic languages, such as Old English  (plural ), denoting a deity in Anglo-Saxon paganism, preserved only as a prefix  in personal names (e.g. "elfshot").

In Old High German, Old Dutch and Old Saxon, the word is only attested in personal and place names, e.g. Ansebert, Anselm, Ansfrid, Vihans. The Old High German is reconstructed as *, plural *.

Gothic has  as reported by Jordanes, who wrote in the 6th century CE, presumably a Latinized form of actual plural ), as a name for euhemerized semi-divine early Gothic rulers.

The ansuz rune, was named after the Æsir. *ansuz, itself comes from Proto-Indo-European *h₂énsus (gen. ) "life force" (cf. Avestan aŋhū "lord; lifetime", ahura "godhood", Sanskrit ásu "life force", ásura "demons" ( *). It is widely accepted that this word is further related to *- "to engender" (cf. Hittite hass- "to procreate, give birth", Tocharian B ās- "to produce").

Norse mythology
The interaction between the Æsir and the Vanir has provoked an amount of scholarly theory and speculation. While other cultures have had "elder" and "younger" families of gods, as with the Titans versus the Olympians of ancient Greece, the Æsir and Vanir were portrayed as contemporaries. The two clans of gods fought battles, concluded treaties, and exchanged hostages (Freyr and Freyja are mentioned as hostages).

An áss like Ullr is almost unknown in the myths, but his name is seen in a lot of geographical names, especially in Sweden, and may also appear on the 3rd century Thorsberg chape, suggesting that his cult was widespread in prehistoric times.

The names of the first three Æsir in Norse mythology, Vili, Vé and Odin all refer to spiritual or mental state, vili to conscious will or desire, vé to the sacred or numinous and óðr to the manic or ecstatic.

Æsir and Vanir

A second clan of gods, the Vanir, is also mentioned in Norse mythology: the god Njörðr and his children, Freyr and Freyja, are the most prominent Vanir gods who join the Æsir as hostages after a war between Æsir and Vanir. The Vanir appear to have mainly been connected with cultivation and fertility and the Æsir were connected with power and war.

In the Eddas, however, the word Æsir is used for gods in general, while Asynjur is used for the goddesses in general. For example, in the poem Skírnismál, Freyr was called "Prince of the Æsir". In the Prose Edda, Njörðr was introduced as "the third among the Æsir", and among the Asynjur, Freya is always listed second only to Frigg.

In surviving tales, the origins of many of the Æsir are unexplained. Originally, there are just three: Odin and his brothers Vili and Vé. Odin's sons by giantesses are naturally counted as Æsir. Heimdallr and Ullr's connection with the Æsir is not clearly mentioned. Loki is a jötunn, and Njörðr is a Vanir hostage, but they are often ranked among the Æsir.

Scholarly theories and interpretations
Given the difference between their roles and emphases, some scholars have speculated that the interactions between the Æsir and the Vanir reflect the types of interaction that were occurring between social classes (or clans) within Norse society at the time. According to another theory, the Vanir (and the fertility cult associated with them) may be more archaic than that of the more warlike Æsir, such that the mythical war may mirror a half-remembered religious conflict. This argument was first suggested by Wilhelm Mannhardt in 1877 (as described in Dumézil, xxiii and Munch, 288). On a similar note, Marija Gimbutas argues that the Æsir and the Vanir represent the displacement of an indigenous Indo-European group by a tribe of warlike invaders as part of her Kurgan hypothesis. See her case in The Living Goddess for more details. Another historical theory is that the inter-pantheon interaction may be an apotheosisation of the conflict between the Roman Kingdom and the Sabines.

Finally, the noted comparative religion scholar Mircea Eliade speculated that this conflict is actually a later version of an Indo-European myth concerning the conflict between and eventual integration of a pantheon of sky/warrior/ruler gods and a pantheon of earth/economics/fertility gods, with no strict historical antecedents.

List of Æsir

The Prose Edda lists both male and female gods of the Æsir, in the 34th and 35th passages of the Gylfaginning. The Gylfaginning does not include Odin in this portion, perhaps considering him outside the ranking.

 (21.) Thor is the foremost of them. He is called Asa-Thor, or Oku-Thor. He is the strongest of all gods and men, and rules over the realm which is called Þrúðvangr.
 (22.) Odin's second son is Baldr
 (23.) the third asa is he who is called Njörðr.
 (24.) Njörðr, in Noatun, afterward begat two children: a son, by name Freyr, and a daughter, by name Freyja. They were fair of face, and mighty. Freyr is arguably the most famous of the asas. He rules over rain and sunshine, and over the fruits of the earth. It is good to call on him for harvests and peace. He also sways the wealth of men. Freyja is the most famous of the goddesses. ...
 (25.) There is yet an asa, whose name is Týr. He is very daring and stout-hearted. He sways victory in war, wherefore warriors should call on him.
 (26.) Bragi is the name of another of the asas. He is famous for his wisdom, eloquence and flowing speech.
 (27.) Heimdallr is the name of one. He is also called the white-asa. He is great and holy; born of nine maidens, all of whom were sisters. He is also called Hallinskide and Gullintanne, for his teeth were of gold.
 (28.) Höðr hight one of the asas, who is blind, but exceedingly strong; and the gods would wish that this asa never needed to be named, for the work of his hand will long be kept in memory both by gods and men.
 (29.) Víðarr is the name of the silent asa. He has a very thick shoe, and he is the strongest next after Thor. From him the gods have much help in all hard tasks.
 (30.) Váli, is the son of Odin and Rindr. He is daring in combat, and a good shot.
 (31.) Ullr is the name of one, who is a son of Sif, and a step-son of Thor. He is so good an archer, and so fast on his skis, that no one can contend with him. He is fair of face, and possesses every quality of a warrior. Men should invoke him in single combat.
 (32.) Forseti is a son of Baldr and Nanna, Nep's daughter. He has in heaven the hall which hight Glitner. All who come to him with disputes go away perfectly reconciled. Just to listen to People's Future. No better tribunal is to be found among gods and men. [...]
 (33.) There is yet one who is numbered among the asas, but whom some call the backbiter of the asas. He is the originator of deceit, and the disgrace of all gods and men. His name is Loki, or Lopt. ... His wife hight Sigyn, and their son, Nare, or Narfe.

Corresponding to the fourteen Æsir listed above, section 35 lists fourteen asynjur (goddesses):

"Ganglere asked: Which are the goddesses? Har answered:"
 Frigg is the first; she possesses the right lordly dwelling which is called Fensaler.
 The second is Sága, who dwells in Sokvabek, and this is a large dwelling.
 The third is Eir, who is a goddess of medicine and medical care.
 The fourth is Gefjon, who is a may, and those who die maids become her hand-maidens.
 The fifth is Fulla, who is also a may, she wears her hair flowing and has a golden ribbon about her head; she carries Frigg's chest, takes care of her shoes and knows her secrets.
 The sixth is Freyja, who is ranked with Frigg. She is wedded to the man whose name is Oder; their daughter's name is Hnos, and she is so fair that all things fair and precious are called, from her name, Hnos. Oder went far away. Freyja weeps for him, but her tears are red gold. Freyja has many names, and the reason therefor is that she changed her name among the various nations to which she came in search of Oder. She is called Mardol, Horn, Gefn, and Syr. She has the necklace Brising, and she is called Vanadis.
 The seventh is Sjöfn, who is fond of turning men's and women's hearts to love, and it is from her name that love is called Sjafne.
 The eighth is Lofn, who is kind and good to those who call upon her, and she has permission from Alfather or Frigg to bring together men and women, no matter what difficulties may stand in the way; therefore "love" is so called from her name, and also that which is much loved by men.
 The ninth is Var. She hears the oaths and troths that men and women plight to each other. Hence such vows are called vars, and she takes vengeance on those who break their promises.
 The tenth is Vör, who is so wise and searching that nothing can be concealed from her. It is a saying that a woman becomes vor (ware) of what she becomes wise.
 The eleventh is Syn, who guards the door of the hall, and closes it against those who are not to enter. In trials she guards those suits in which anyone tries to make use of falsehood. Hence is the saying that "syn is set against it," when anyone tries to deny ought.
 The twelfth is Hlín, who guards those men whom Frigg wants to protect from any danger. Hence is the saying that he hlins who is forewarned.
 The thirteenth is Snotra, who is wise and courtly. After her, men and women who are wise are called Snotras.
 The fourteenth is Gna, whom Frigg sends on her errands into various worlds. She rides upon a horse called Hofvarpner, that runs through the air and over the sea. Once, when she was riding, some vanir saw her faring through the air. [...]
Sól and Bil are numbered among the goddesses, but their nature has already been described.

The A-rune

The a-rune, ansuz, Younger Futhark ᚬ, was probably named after the Æsir. The name in this sense survives only in the Icelandic Rune Poem as Óss, referring to Óðinn, who is identified with Jupiter:
 Óss er algingautr / ok ásgarðs jöfurr, / ok valhallar vísi. / Jupiter oddviti. 
"Óss is Aged Gautr / and prince of Asgard / and lord of Valhalla / chieftain Jupiter."

The name of  a in the Gothic alphabet is ahsa. The common Germanic name of the rune may thus have either been ansuz "God, one of the Æsir", or ahsam "ear (of corn)"

Asleikr

The personal names Old Norse Ásleikr (Latinised as Ansleicus), Old English Óslác (modern "Hasluck") and Old High German Ansleh may continue the term for a sacrificial performance for the gods in early Germanic paganism. Grimm's Deutsches Wörterbuch (s.v. "Leich") compares *laikom to the meaning of Greek , denoting first the ceremonial procession to the sacrifice, but also ritual dance and hymns pertaining to religious ritual. Paul Herrman (1906) identified as such *ansulaikom the victory songs of the Batavi after defeating Quintus Petillius Cerialis in the Revolt of the Batavi in the year AD 69 according to Tacitus' account, and also the "nefarious song" accompanied by "running in a circle" around the head of a decapitated goat sacrificed to (he presumes) Wodan (Odin), sung by the Lombards at their victory celebration in 579 according to the report of Pope Gregory I (Dialogues ch. 28).

Ásatrú

Ásatrú, a kind of Heathenry whose name means "faith in the Æsir", is a new religious movement of polytheistic reconstructionism based on Norse paganism. As of 2007, Ásatrú is a religion officially recognized by the governments of Denmark, Iceland, Norway, and Sweden.

Most adherents do not emphasize worship of the Æsir in particular and refer to their practice as "Forn sed/sidr/siður" meaning old customs. The Icelandic Ásatrúarfélagið describes Ásatrú as "Nordic pantheism" involving "belief in the Icelandic/Nordic folklore" including all the "spirits and entities" besides "gods and other beings" this entails.

See also
 Horses of the Æsir
 Common Germanic deities
 List of Germanic deities
Tuatha Dé Danann

References

Bibliography
 DuBois, Thomas A. (1999). Nordic Religions in the Viking Age. Philadelphia, PA: University of Pennsylvania Press. 
 Dumézil, Georges (1973). Gods of the Ancient Northmen. Edited by Einar Haugen; Introduction by C. Scott Littleton and Udo Strutynski. Berkeley, CA: University of California Press. 
 Grimm, Jacob (1882–83). Teutonic Mythology. 4 vols. Trans. James Steven Stallybrass. London: Bell.
 Munch, P. A. (1926). Norse Mythology: Legends of Gods and Heroes. In the revision of Magnus Olsen; translated from the Norwegian by Sigurd Bernhard Hustvedt. New York: The American-Scandinavian Foundation; London: H. Milford, Oxford University Press.
 Orchard, Andy (2002). Cassell's Dictionary of Norse Myth and Legend. London: Cassell. 
 Turville-Petre, Gabriel (1964). Myth and Religion of the North: The Religion of Ancient Scandinavia. New York: Holt, Rinehart and Winston. 
 De Vries, Jan [1956–57] (1970). Altgermanische Religionsgeschichte. 2 vols. 2nd ed. Berlin: De Gruyter.

External links

 Viktor Rydberg's "Teutonic Mythology: Gods and Goddesses of the Northland" e-book
 W. Wagner's "Asgard and the Home of the Gods" e-book
 "Myths of Northern Lands" e-book by H. A. Guerber
 Peter Andreas Munch's "Norse Mythology: Legends of Gods and Heroes" e-book
 Bartleby: American Heritage Dictionary: Indo-European roots: ansu

 
Germanic paganism